Connected is a 1992 album by Stereo MC's. The tracks "Connected", "Ground Level", "Step It Up" and "Creation" became hit singles.

Critical reception 

In a contemporary review, James Muretich from Calgary Herald said that "the hour-long program does wear a wee thin but, hey, while the groove-mood lasts, it`s a blast". Music critic Robert Christgau for The Village Voice, wrote that, although its music is amiable and rhythmic, Connected is also "so multifaceted that its functionality is fungible and forgettable." In June 2000, Q placed Connected as #52 in its list of the 100 Greatest British Albums Ever. The album won Best British Album at the 1994 Brit Awards, was shortlisted for the 1993 Mercury Prize, and included in the book 1001 Albums You Must Hear Before You Die.

Track listing
All songs written by Robert Birch (Rob B)/Nicholas Hallam (The Head), except where noted
 "Connected" (Birch/Hallam/H.W. Casey/Richard Finch) – 5:14
Contains a sample from "Let Me (Let Me Be Your Lover)" by Jimmy "Bo" Horne.
 "Ground Level" – 4:13 
 "Everything" (Birch/Hallam/James L. Worthy) – 3:47 
 "Sketch" (Birch/Hallam/Tuzé DeAbreu)– 5:44
Contains a sample of "Passarinho" by Gal Costa.
 "Fade Away" – 4:25 
 "All Night Long" – 4:07 
 "Step It Up" – 4:59
 "Playing With Fire" – 4:20
Uses the piano progression from the introduction to Monkey Man on Let it Bleed by the Rolling Stones
Contains a sample of "Opportunities (Let's Make Lots of Money)" by Pet Shop Boys.
 "Pressure" – 3:50 
 "Chicken Shake" – 3:50 
 "Creation" – 5:03 
 "Don't Let Up" (feat. Mica Paris) – 3:09
 "The End" (Birch/Hallum/Carole King/Toni Stern) – 3:47

Personnel

Stereo MCs
Robert Charles "Rob B." Birch: Vocals
Nick "The Head" Hallam: DJ
Ian Frederick "Owen If" Rossiter: Drums, Percussion
Cath Coffey: Backing Vocals

Additional personnel
James Hallawell: Keyboards, Organ
Paul O. Kane, Matthew Seligman: Bass
Chicu Modu: Sax
Ivan Hussey, Johnny T., Anya Ulman, Laura Cochrane: Strings
Kick Horns: Brass

Singles
"Connected" (#18 in the United Kingdom, 14 September 1992)
"Step It Up" (#12 in the United Kingdom, 23 November 1992)
"Ground Level" (#19 in the United Kingdom, 8 February 1993)
"Creation" (#19 in United Kingdom, 17 May 1993)

Charts

Certifications and sales

References

1992 albums
4th & B'way Records albums
1993 albums
Stereo MCs albums
Brit Award for British Album of the Year